Levon Isayevich Mirzoyan (14 November 1897 – 26 February 1939) was the Secretary of the Communist Party of the Azeri SSR from 21 January 1926 to 5 August 1929 and the First Secretary of the Communist Party of the Kazakh SSR from 5 December 1936 to 3 May 1938, where he succeeded Filipp Goloshschyokin as leader during the Soviet-imposed Kazakh Famine of 1930–1933, also known as the Goloshchyokin Genocide, in which an estimated 1.3 million ethnic Kazakhs died. An estimated 38 to 42 percent of all Kazakhs died, the highest percentage of any ethnic group killed by the Soviet famine of 1930–1933. Other sources state that as many as 2.0 to 2.3 million people died.

Biography 

Mirzoyan was born in the village of Ashan in Shusha District of the Elisabethpol Governorate in an Armenian peasant family. In 1917, he joined the Russian Social Democratic Labour Party (RSDLP). In 1926–1929, he was the First Secretary of the Communist Party of Azerbaijan. In 1929–1933, he was the Secretary of the Perm Regional Committee, then the 2nd Secretary of the Ural Regional Committee of the Communist Party of the Soviet Union (CPSU). In 1933, he became the 1st Secretary of the Regional Committee of the Party of Kazakhstan. In 1937, he became the 1st secretary of the Communist Party (Bolshevik) of Kazakhstan. He was a member of the CEC of the USSR.

As Secretary of the Communist Party of Kazakhstan, he led the Soviet-imposed Kazakh Famine of 1930–1933, also known as the 'Goloshchyokin Genocide' by some scholars. As a result of the famine, an estimated 1.3 million ethnic Kazakhs died, around 38 to 42 percent of the entire Kazakh population. As Historian Sarah Cameron describes it in an interview with Harvard University's Davis Center, "[in] a strategy explicitly modeled upon a technique that was used against starving Ukrainians, several regions of Kazakhstan were blacklisted. That essentially entraps starving Kazakhs in zones of death where no food could be found." 

Mirzoyan was noted to be repressive particularly toward famine refugees and denied food aid to areas run by cadres who asked for more food for their regions using, in the words of Sarah Cameron, "teary telegrams"; in one instance under Mirzoyan's rule, a plenipotentiary shoved food aid documents into his pocket and had a wedding celebration instead of transferring them for a whole month while hundreds of Kazakhs starved. A genocide remembrance day is commenced on 31 May for the victims of the famine. 

In 1938, Mirzoyan sent a telegram to Joseph Stalin and Vyacheslav Molotov, in which he expressed his disagreement with the decision to move the Koreans deported to Kazakhstan in 1936 from Primorye, in the southern part of the republic, to the north, where they could not engage in rice cultivation. He also expressed his doubts about the working methods of the NKVD (the Soviet secret service later known as the KGB). In the summer of 1938, Mirzoyan was arrested and detained in Lefortovo Prison in Moscow. On 26 February 1939, he was executed. He was rehabilitated in 1958.

References

External links

1897 births
1939 deaths
People from Shushi Province
People from Elizavetpol Governorate
First Secretaries of the Communist Party of Kazakhstan
Azerbaijani people of Armenian descent
Kazakhstani people of Armenian descent
Recipients of the Order of Lenin
Great Purge victims from Armenia
Armenian people executed by the Soviet Union
Soviet rehabilitations
Armenian atheists
Central Executive Committee of the Soviet Union members
Central Committee of the Communist Party of the Soviet Union members
First convocation members of the Supreme Soviet of the Soviet Union
Members of the Communist Party of the Soviet Union executed by the Soviet Union
First secretaries of the Azerbaijan Communist Party

Soviet Armenians
Armenians in Azerbaijan
People of Armenian descent
Persecution of Turkic peoples
Persecution of Kazakhs